The Governorate of Chiloé was political and military subdivision of the Spanish Empire that existed, with a 1784–1789 interregnum, from 1567 to 1826. The Governorate of Chiloé depended on the Captaincy General of Chile until the late 18th century when it was made dependent directly on the Viceroyalty of Peru. The administrative change was done simultaneously as the capital of the archipelago was moved from Castro to Ancud in 1768. The last Royal Governor of Chiloé, Antonio de Quintanilla, depended directly on the central government in Madrid.

Extent
The Governorate of Chiloé had its de jure northern limit a Bueno River in continental Chile. There the governorate limited with the territories of Valdivia. The area de facto controlled included the Chiloé Archipelago, the seashore forts and settlements north of Chacao Channel plus the Mission of Nahuel Huapi which was nevertheless financed from Valdivia. Historian Gabriel Guarda do however disagree claiming the Mission of Nahuel Huapi was within the jurisdiction of Valdivia. The so-called juncos of Osorno (Huilliches) attempted in the late 18th century to have their lands, that lied just south of Bueno River, to be removed from the Governorate of Chiloé and incorporated to Valdivia. The reason of this was their bad relation and history of warfare with the settlements of around Chacao Channel.

Royal governors
All 17th century Royal Governors were named by the Royal Governor of Chile. In the 18th century this system changed and while still named by the Royal Governor of Chile the position were to be ratified by the King of Spain. Later in the 18th century the Viceroy of Peru took over the duties of naming governors but still with the need of ratification by the King of Spain. Formally the office was granted based on merits during all of the 17th century. However, in the early 18th century "pecuniary service" begun also to be considered, which meant in practice that the office could be purchased. This practice was abolished in 1750. The office of Governor of Chiloé was commonly used to booster a carrier and then access more desirable positions of power in Central Chile.

The position of Royal Governor of Chiloé dates to the early 17th century. Before that a succession of corregidores existed including Alonso Benítez and Alonso de Góngora Marmolejo. Antonio Mejía who was sent by Alonso de Ribera to rule Chiloé died in a shipwreck in 1603 while approaching the archipelago.

Andrés Herrera (?–1643)
Fernando de Alvarado (1643–?)
Ignacio Carrera Iturgoyen (c. 1650)
Antonio Manríquez de Lara (1680s)
Bartolomé Gallardo
José Marín de Velasco (1708–1712, 1715–1719)
Blas de Vera Ponce y León
Nicolás Salvo (1719–1723)
Juan Dávila de Herzelles (1724–1728)
Fracisco José Sotomayor
Bartolomé Carrillo
Alonso Sánchez del Pozo
Francisco Gutiérrez de Espejo (1740–1741)
Victoriano Martínez de Tineo (1743–1748)
Antonio Narciso de Santa María (1749–1761)
Juan Antonio Garretón (1761–1765)
Manuel Fernández de Castelblanco (1765–1768)
Carlos de Beranger Dusonet (1768–?)
Antonio Martínez y La Espada

The "notables" of Chiloé, represented by the local cabildo had a conflictive relation with governor Martínez y La Espada. The cabildo made complaints to the authorities in Lima. Between 1784 and 1789 the position of governor was abolished and replaced by an intendant. The sole intendant of this period was Francisco Hurtado del Pino.

Francisco Garos (1788–1789)
Pedro Cañaveral y Ponce (1789–1790 or 1791)
Juan Antonio Montes de la Puente (1797–?) 
Ignacio María Justiz y Urrutia
Antonio de Quintanilla (1820–1826)

References

Sources 

 01
.
History of the Captaincy General of Chile
Viceroyalty of Peru
17th century in the Captaincy General of Chile
18th century in Chile
18th century in the Viceroyalty of Peru
19th century in the Viceroyalty of Peru
1600s establishments in the Captaincy General of Chile
1600s establishments in the Viceroyalty of Peru
1780s disestablishments in the Viceroyalty of Peru
1780s establishments in the Viceroyalty of Peru
1820s disestablishments in the Viceroyalty of Peru
1820s disestablishments in the Spanish Empire
Chiloe
Chiloe
Chiloé Archipelago
16th-century Chilean people
17th-century Chilean people
18th-century Chilean people